This is a list of international football games played by the Germany national football team from 2020 to present.

Results and fixtures

2020

2021

2022

2023

Notes

References

External links

Football in Germany
Germany national football team results
2020s in German sport